The exploitation of natural resources is the use of natural resources for economic growth, sometimes with a negative connotation of accompanying environmental degradation. Environmental degradation can result from depletion of natural resources, this would be accompanied by negative effects to the economic growth of the effected areas.

Exploitation of natural resources started to emerge on an industrial scale in the 19th century as the extraction and processing of raw materials (such as in mining, steam power, and machinery) developed much further than it had in preindustrial areas. During the 20th century, energy consumption rapidly increased. Today, about 80% of the world's energy consumption is sustained by the extraction of fossil fuels, which consists of oil, coal and natural gas. 

Another non-renewable resource that is exploited by humans is subsoil minerals such as precious metals that are mainly used in the production of industrial commodities. Intensive agriculture is an example of a mode of production that hinders many aspects of the natural environment, for example the degradation of forests in a terrestrial ecosystem and water pollution in an aquatic ecosystem. As the world population rises and economic growth occurs, the depletion of natural resources influenced by the unsustainable extraction of raw materials becomes an increasing concern.

Why resources are under pressure
Increase in the sophistication of technology  enabling natural resources to be extracted quickly and efficiently. E.g., in the past, it could take long  hours just to cut down one tree only using saws. Due to increased technology, rates of deforestation have greatly increased.
The number of humans is increasing. According to the UN, the world population was 7.6 billion in 2017. This number is expected to rise to about 10 billion in 2050 and about 11 billion in 2100. 
Cultures of consumerism. Materialistic views lead to the mining of gold and diamonds to produce jewelry, unnecessary commodities for human life or advancement. Consumerism also leads to extraction of resources for the production of commodities necessary for human life but in amounts excessive of what is needed, because people consume more than is necessary or waste what they have. 
Excessive demand often leads to conflicts due to intense competition. Organizations such as Global Witness and the United Nations have documented the connection.
Lack of awareness among the population is striking. People are not aware of ways to reduce depletion and exploitation of materials.

Consequences of exploitation of resources

Natural resources are not limitless, and the following consequences can arise from the careless and excessive consumption of these resources:
Deforestation
Desertification
Extinction of species
Forced migration
Soil erosion
Oil depletion
Ozone depletion
Greenhouse gas increase
Extreme energy
Water gasification
Natural hazard/Natural disaster
Metals and minerals depletion

Effects on local communities

The Global South

When a mining company enters in a developing country in the global south to extract raw materials, advocating the advantages of the industry's presence and minimizing the potential negative effects gain cooperation of the local people. Advantageous factors are primarily in economic development so services that the government could not provide such as health centers, police departments and schools can be established. However, with economic development, money becomes a dominant subject of interest. This can bring about major conflicts that a local community in a developing country has never dealt with before.  These conflicts emerge by a change to more egocentric views among the locals influenced by consumerist values.

The effects of the exploitation of natural resources in the local community of a developing country are exhibited in the impacts from the Ok Tedi Mine. After BHP entered into Papua New Guinea to exploit copper and gold, the economy of the indigenous peoples boomed. Although their quality of life has improved, initially disputes were common among the locals in terms of land rights and who should be getting the benefits from the mining project. The consequences of the Ok Tedi environmental disaster illustrate the potential negative effects from the exploitation of natural resources. The resulting mining pollution includes toxic contamination of the natural water supply for communities along the Ok Tedi River, causing widespread killing of aquatic life. When a mining company ends a project after extracting the raw materials from an area of a developing country, the local people are left to manage with the environmental damage done to their community and the long run sustainability of the economic benefits stimulated by the mining company's presence becomes a concern.

See also
 Sustainability
 International Day for Preventing the Exploitation of the Environment in War and Armed Conflict
 List of environmental issues
 Myth of superabundance
 Over-consumption
 Overexploitation
 Spaceship Earth

References

Environmental issues
Natural resources